Barren Township may refer to:

 Barren Township, Independence County, Arkansas
 Barren Township, Jackson County, Arkansas
 Barren Township, Franklin County, Illinois

Township name disambiguation pages